Paljavesi is a medium-sized lake in Finland. It is located in the Southern Savonia region in Finland, in the municipality of Mikkeli. The lake belongs to the Vuoksi main catchment area.

See also
List of lakes in Finland

References

Lakes of Mikkeli